The Medusae Fossae Formation is a large geological formation of probable volcanic origin on the planet Mars. It is named for the Medusa of Greek mythology. "Fossae" is Latin for "trenches". 
The formation is a collection of soft, easily eroded deposits that extends discontinuously for more than 5,000 km along the equator of Mars. Its roughly-shaped regions extend from just south of Olympus Mons to Apollinaris Patera, with a smaller additional region closer to Gale Crater.  

The total area of the formation is equal to 20% the size of the continental United States.   It is divided into three subunits (members) that are all considered to be of Amazonian age, the youngest era in martian geological history. 
The formation straddles the highland - lowland boundary near the Tharsis and Elysium volcanic areas, and extends across five quadrangles: Amazonis, Tharsis, Memnonia, Elysium, and Aeolis.

Origin and age 
The origin of the formation is unknown, but many theories have been presented over the years.
In 2020, a group of researchers headed by Peter Mouginis-Mark has hypothesized that the formation could have been formed from pumice rafts from the volcano Olympus Mons.  In 2012, a group headed by Laura Kerber hypothesized that it could have been formed from ash from the volcanoes Apollinaris Mons, Arsia Mons, and possibly Pavonis Mons.   

An analysis of data from the Mars Odyssey Neutron Spectrometer revealed that the western lobe of the Medusae Fossae Formation contains some water.  This means that this formation contains bulk water ice.  During periods of high obliquity (tilt) water ice was stable on the surface.

Combining several gravity models of Mars with the MOLA topographic dataset allowed calculation of the density of the deposit; the value is 1.765 ± 0.105 g/cm3, similar to the density of terrestrial ignimbrites. This rules out significant amounts of ice in the bulk composition. In combination with the deposit's high content of sulfur and chlorine, it implies an explosive volcanic origin. The total volume of the deposit is 1.4 × 106 km3; such a large deposit might have been emplaced in periodic eruptions over an interval of 500 million years.

Appearance and composition 
In some places, the formation appears as a smooth and gently undulating surface, while in others it is wind-sculpted into ridges and grooves. Radar imaging has suggested that the region may contain either extremely porous rock (for example volcanic ash) or deep layers of glacier-like ice deposits amounting to about the same quantity as is stored in Mars' south polar cap.  Further evidence for a fine-grained composition is the fact that the area gives almost no radar return.

Inverted relief

The lower portion (member) of Medusae Fossae Formation contains many patterns and shapes that are thought to be the remains of streams.  It is believed that streams formed valleys that were filled and became resistant to erosion by cementation of minerals or by the gathering of a coarse covering layer to form an inverted relief.  These inverted stream beds are sometimes called sinuous ridges or raised curvilinear features.  They have been divided into six classes: flat-crested, narrow-crested, round-crested, branching, non-branching, and multilevel.  They may be a kilometer or so in length.  Their height ranges from a meter to greater than 10 meters, while the width of the narrow ones is less than 10 meters.

Yardangs and dust
Comparisons of elemental composition suggest that the Medusae Fossae Formation has been a source of Mars' ubiquitous surface dust. In July 2018, researchers reported that it may be the largest single source of dust on the planet.

The surface of the formation has been eroded by the wind into a series of linear ridges called yardangs. These ridges generally point in direction of the prevailing winds that carved them, and demonstrate the erosive power of Martian winds. The easily eroded nature of the Medusae Fossae Formation suggests that it is composed of weakly cemented particles, and was most likely formed by the deposition of wind-blown dust or volcanic ash. Yardangs are parts of rock that have been sand blasted into long, skinny ridges by bouncing sand particles blowing in the wind. Layers are seen in parts of the formation.  A resistant caprock on the top of yardangs has been observed in Viking, Mars Global Surveyor, and HiRISE photos.  Images from spacecraft show that they have different degrees of hardness probably because of significant variations in the physical properties, composition, particle size, and/or cementation. Very few impact craters are visible throughout the area so the surface is relatively young.

See also
 Aeolis quadrangle
 Amazonis Planitia
 Amazonis quadrangle
 Geology of Mars
 Groundwater on Mars 
 Impact crater
 Yardangs on Mars

External links 
 Graphical image of the geographical extent of the Medusae Fossae Formation, Nature Communications

References 

Surface features of Mars
Amazonis quadrangle
Valleys and canyons on Mars